Maria Dangell (born 30 March 1974) is an international singer, pianist, and songwriter.

Dangell was born in a Jewish family in Tallinn, Estonia. She started to learn classical piano at the Tallinn Music School at the age of seven, and eventually studied it at the Conservatoire. Her career of pianist, singer and songwriter began in early school years. She performed live on stage and in recording studios as soloist and producer of her own musical creations. She also participated in duet collaborations with Bobby Kimball (from Toto) on "The Heaven of Milano" and with Amedeo Minghi on "La Vita Mia", broadcast by RAI Uno on 28 March 2009 and on 1 September 2011.

Maria has been asked to collaborate on the "Hearts of Peace in the Middle East" project, whose goal is to open people's hearts and contribute to establishing peace in the Middle East. She sings the song "Jerusalem" ("Gerusalemme") written by Amedeo Minghi on Vatican's appeal. A performance of the song (Amedeo Minghi, Maria Dangell and Hakeem Abu Jaleela) took place on 1 April 2009 in Bethlehem in presence of 1500 pilgrims and media. She discussed the project with Dr. Hans-Gert Poettering, at the time the President of the European Parliament, in 2008 and brought it to the attention of international media and political institutions in order to get heard giving a clear example of how three world religions can open a peaceful dialogue among each other.

Dangell speaks eight languages: English, German, Italian, Spanish, Estonian, Russian, French and Armenian.

References

External links
Maria Dangell's Official Website
Maria Dangell's at Festival of Italian Song in Munich, Germany
Maria Dangell on Amedeo Minghi's 28th Album
Maria Dangell for peace in the Middle East

1974 births
Living people
21st-century Estonian women singers
Estonian pianists
Estonian songwriters
Singers from Tallinn
Estonian Jews
20th-century Estonian women singers
21st-century pianists
20th-century women pianists
21st-century women pianists